Trachyspermum is a genus in the plant family Apiaceae.

Species:
 Trachyspermum ammi, ajwain
 Trachyspermum roxburghianum, radhuni
 Trachyspermum stewartii

References

Apiaceae
Apiaceae genera